The Indian Institute of Management Jammu (IIM Jammu) is a public, autonomous business school located in Jammu, Jammu and Kashmir, India. Established in 2016, it is the youngest Indian Institute of Management. IIM Jammu is currently (DBA) in Management as per Indian Institutes of Management Act 2017. The student intake is 240 for the Masters of Business Administration (MBA) programme for the year 2019.

Background 
IIM Jammu is the 20th Indian Institute of Management established by the Ministry of Human Resource Development. It was established with the approval of the Union Cabinet, chaired by the Prime Minister Narendra Modi on 13 October 2016. The Indian Institute of Management (IIM) brand has now become synonymous with innovation,
talent, zeal for success, and contribution in management, From the very beginning, IIM Jammu has set high standards for outstanding value-based
quality education, high-quality research, executive education, consultancy, and strong corporate as well as international linkages. The Institute also encourages, and subtly emphasizes contemporary research - concentrating on regional, national, and global issues alike.

Board of Governors 
The Board of Governors (BoG) govern the administration and working of IIM Jammu. The chairperson of BoG is Mr. Milind Prahlad Kamble, Padma Shree awardee, Chairman and Managing Director of MPK Group of Companies and Founder of Dalit Indian Chamber of Commerce & Industry (DICCI). IIM Jammu is governed by Board of Governors composed of eleven eminent educationists and administrators namely: Mr. Sanjay Kumar Sinha (Joint Secretary Management, Ministry of Human Resource Development, Government of India), Ms. Anita Bhogle (Prosearch Consultants, Mumbai), Mr. Talat Parvez Rohella (Commissioner  Secretary, Higher Education Department, Government of Jammu & Kashmir), Mr. Anand Kripalu (Managing Director, Chief Executive Officer and Member Diageo Global Executive Committee, Mumbai), Mr. Mukund Walvekar (Ex. Managing Director & Chief Executive Officer, Acer Ltd., Bengaluru), Mr. Ranjit Singh (Executive Managing Director, Kalpataru Power Transmission Ltd., Noida), Dr. Shalini Lal (Founder Infinity OD, New Delhi), Mr. Lalit Kumar Shantaram Naik (Director, Noveltech Feeds Private Ltd., Mumbai), Mr. Vijay Gambhire (Managing Director & Chief Executive Officer, CEAT Specialty Tyres Ltd.) and Prof. B. S. Sahay (Director, IIM Jammu)

Campus 
IIM Jammu is constructing its permanent campus in 200 acres of land in Jagti situated 18 kilometres away from Jammu Airport. The permanent campus will offer technologically advanced classrooms, hostels, faculty residence and state of the art infrastructure. Further, IIM Jammu is setting up an Off-Campus Centre at Srinagar.

Union Education Minister, Ramesh Pokhriyal has inaugurated “Anandam: The Center for Happiness” at the Indian Institute of Management (IIM), Jammu virtually. The centre will help people overcome mental stress and help spread positivity and it will encourage and propagate holistic development for all the stakeholders at IIM Jammu.
Lieutenant Governor, Jammu, and Kashmir, Manoj Sinha; Founder, Art of Living Foundation, Sri Sri Ravi Shankar virtually graced the occasion.

Academics 
IIM Jammu is currently offering Masters in Business Administration (MBA), Doctor of Business Administration (DBA) in Management, Executive Education programme and Faculty Development Programme. The MBA programme spans over six trimesters spread over the two years. The fundamental courses that lay the premises for various management roles are covered in the first year. Between the first and second year, students undertake an eight-week summer internship. In the second year, students pursue elective courses from Marketing, Business Policy and Strategy, Finance, Operations Management, Human Resource Management and Organization Behaviour area.  The student intake for 2019–2020 year is 140 which will progressively go up to a cumulative student strength of 200 in the 4th year.
In 2021, IIM Jammu inaugurated its first IPM batch for students after class 12th. Started on the line with other reputed IIMs, this unique five-year program offers students BBA plus MBA degree.

IIM Jammu provides a wide network of corporate placement opportunities for its students and recently collaborated internationally for exploring students dynamics for international experience. In December 2021 it also collaborated with first Venture Studio of India known as RisingIndia ThinkTank

Campus life 
There are many student-run clubs and committee at IIM Jammu. The student-run clubs and committees are governed by Student Affairs Council. The student-run clubs and committee organizes events throughout the year.

References
 

JAMMU
Education in Jammu (city)
Educational institutions established in 2016
2016 establishments in Jammu and Kashmir